Villiger is a German surname. Notable people with the surname include:

Burchard Villiger (1816–1903), Swiss-American jesuit priest
Claudia Villiger (born 1969), Swiss figure skater
Kaspar Villiger (born 1941), Swiss industrialist and politician
Mark Villiger (born 1950), South African judge
René Villiger (1931–2010), Swiss painter
Victor Villiger (1868–1934), Swiss-German chemist 
Baeyer–Villiger oxidation
Walther Augustin Villiger (1872–1938), German astronomer

Swiss-German surnames